Japan competed at the 1992 Winter Olympics in Albertville, France, from February 8 to February 23, 1992. As many as 63 athletes competed accompanied by 42 officers. Japanese athletes compete in all disciplines except ice hockey.

The flag bearer is short track speed skater Tsutomu Kawasaki at the opening and closing ceremony, while the captain of the delegation is cross-country skier Kazunari Sasaki.

The nordic combined team consisting of Kenji Ogiwara, Takanori Kono and Reiichi Mikata won gold which became Japan's first medal in nordic combined and also the first gold after four previous Winter Olympics editions without gold. The last gold which was also Japan's first gold at the Winter Olympics was won by Yukio Kasaya at their home, Sapporo 1972. Midori Ito also won Japan's first medal in figure skating.

Medalists

Competitors
The following is the list of number of competitors in the Games.

Alpine skiing

Men

Men's combined

Women

Women's combined

Biathlon

Men

Women

 1 A penalty loop of 150 metres had to be skied per missed target.
 2 One minute added per missed target.

Bobsleigh

Cross-country skiing

Men

 1 Starting delay based on 10 km results. 
 C = Classical style, F = Freestyle

Women

 2 Starting delay based on 5 km results. 
 C = Classical style, F = Freestyle

Women's 4 × 5 km relay

Figure skating

Men

Women

Pairs

Freestyle skiing

Men

Luge

Men

(Men's) Doubles

Nordic combined 

Men's individual

Events:
 normal hill ski jumping 
 15 km cross-country skiing 

Men's team

Three participants per team.

Events:
 normal hill ski jumping 
 10 km cross-country skiing

Short track speed skating

Men

Women

Ski jumping 

Men's team large hill

 1 Four teams members performed two jumps each. The best three were counted.

Speed skating

Men

Women

References

Official Olympic Reports
International Olympic Committee results database
Japan Olympic Committee database
 Olympic Winter Games 1992, full results by sports-reference.com

Nations at the 1992 Winter Olympics
1992
Winter Olympics